Tintu Luka (born 26 April 1989) is an Indian track and field athlete, who predominantly competes in the middle-distance running events. Born in Valathode, Kerala, she is the national record holder in the women's 800 metres. Luka represented India at the 2012 and 2016 Summer Olympics. In addition to being the 2015 Asian Champion in the 800 meters, she has won a total of six medals at the Asian Athletics Championships.

Luka also competes in sprinting events including 400 metres and the 4 × 400 metres relay, and was a part of the gold medal winning relay team at the 2013 Asian Athletics Championships and the 2014 Asian Games. She is mentored by Indian Olympian P. T. Usha, and trains at the Usha School of Athletics, Koyilandy, Kerala. She was awarded Arjuna award, the country's second-highest sporting honour by Government of India in 2014.

Early life and junior career

Tintu Luka was born in the small village of Valathode near Karikkottakary in Kannur district, Kerala, India. Her parents are Lukka and Lissy, a state-level long jumper. She has a sister named Angel Lukka. Luka did her schooling from St. Thomas High School, Karikkottakary.

In 2001, Luka joined the PT Usha School of Athletics at Koyilandy, and started training under the guidance of her coach P T Usha. In 2008, she bagged her first international medal in form of a silver at the Junior Asian Athletics Championships.

Performance at international level

In 2008, Luka won a silver medal in the 800-metre race at the Asian Junior Athletics Championship in Jakarta.

At 2010 Commonwealth Games Luka finished in sixth place in the women's 800m with a timing of 2:01.25s. PT Usha responded to this performance, saying that Tintu Luka had not been exposed to such a large crowd before and that the crowd's applause and cheering could have made her lose concentration and run faster without prior planning.

Luka won the bronze medal in the women's 800 metres event of the track and field competitions at the Asian Games 2010. Tintu, who had a disappointing finish in the 2010 Commonwealth Games, led the pack right from the start, but couldn't keep pace in the last 50 metres and finished third with a timing of 2:01.36 seconds.

In the Continental Cup, Croatia, 2010, Luka timed 1:59.17, to break Shiny Wilson’s 15-year-old national record of 1:59.85 in the 800m event.

In the second of the three semi-finals for 800 metres event at the London 2012 Summer Olympics, Luka finished sixth in her heat clocking an 1:59.69 seconds her seasons best, but could not qualify for the finals. For her performance at the Summer Olympics, the Government of Kerela awarded her  and will provide her with a job in a gazetted rank.

On 1 October 2014 Luka won the Silver Medal in the 800m at the Asian Games held at Incheon, South Korea. She was also the part of the team that won the Gold Medal in the 4 X 400 m relay at the 2014 Asian Games. The team clocked 3:28:68 to break the Games Record. This is India’s 4th consecutive gold in the event since 2002.

Awards and recognition
Arjuna Award - 2014

Competition record

References

External links
 
Tintu — a rare gem (The Hindu)
Tintu Luka (USHA)
DD India report on Tintu

Living people
1989 births
Sportswomen from Kerala
People from Kannur district
Indian female sprinters
Indian female middle-distance runners
21st-century Indian women
21st-century Indian people
Olympic athletes of India
Athletes (track and field) at the 2012 Summer Olympics
Athletes (track and field) at the 2016 Summer Olympics
Commonwealth Games competitors for India
Athletes (track and field) at the 2010 Commonwealth Games
Athletes (track and field) at the 2014 Commonwealth Games
Asian Games medalists in athletics (track and field)
Athletes (track and field) at the 2010 Asian Games
Athletes (track and field) at the 2014 Asian Games
World Athletics Championships athletes for India
Recipients of the Arjuna Award
Asian Games gold medalists for India
Asian Games silver medalists for India
Asian Games bronze medalists for India
Medalists at the 2010 Asian Games
Medalists at the 2014 Asian Games